Chromosome 7 open reading frame 57 is an uncharacterized protein found in humans and several other homologs. It is encoded by the C7orf57 gene. This gene is found to be greatly expressed in the Fallopian tubes, testes, lungs, hippocampus, hypothalamus, and caudate. There are three isoforms of the gene. Within the gene sequence 9 exons are present. C7orf57 has been linked to lupus, pancreatic cancer sporadic amyotrophic lateral sclerosis. and gastrointestinal toxicity

Gene 
There are three isoforms of C7orf57. Isoform 1 is the longest of the three with 2102 residues and 9 exons. The protein sequence is 295 base pairs. Its locus is 7p12.3. It is often found in nuclear and mitochondrial sub cellular locations.

C7orf57 has a promoter upstream of its transcription site as found in Genomatix. The promoter is 1125 base pairs long, located between 48024511-48025635. It codes for six transcripts of C7orf57.

Protein

Post translation modifications 
There are many phosphorylation sites found on the protein, mostly on serine and threonine. There are also many  glycosylation sites.

Secondary structure 
C7orf57 does not have a known secondary structure, though it is predicted to consist mainly of random coils with some alpha helixes. It is predicted to be similar in structure to Phosphoribosylanthranilate isomerase.

Tissue expression 
C7orf57 has increased expressed in the larynx, testis, fallopian tubes, lungs, and parts of the brain. It is expressed in lower amounts with pathology.

Evolution 
Orthologs have been found in mammals, ranging from primates to amphibians. There are also orthologs found in more distant species such as birds, reptiles, and fish with the most distant relative being a whale shark. There are two paralogs of the gene, for actin a and actin b. The gene has evolved at a steady pace when compared to a slow and a fast evolving gene.

Clinical significance 
C7orf57 has been linked to several diseases, including pancreatic cancer, sporadic amyotrophic lateral sclerosis (ALS), systematic lupus erythematous (SLE), and gastrointestinal toxicity. In a study that analyzed pancreatic cancer cells, it was found that when a patient was treated with metformin and aspirin, C7orf57 was unregulated by over 10 fold. Another disease of interest is gastrointestinal toxicity. A high correlation between C7orf57 and an increased risk of experiencing severe gastrointestinal toxicity was found with a  r2 value of 1.0 For ALS, the gene was found to have a nonrandom association with one of the SNPs associated with the disease. However, genome-wide significance was not achieved. The gene is also linked to Lupus as to SNPs in its locus were found to be related to serum IFN-α activity, which is elevated in many lupus patients and therefore is thought to be a causing factor. Like in the ALS study, the locus failed to replicate.

C7orf57 was found to have lower expression than normal when studying individuals with endometriosis and nasopharyngeal carcinoma, a cancer of the head and neck

References